Down in L.A. (1968) was the first album released by Brewer & Shipley.

Track listing
All tracks composed by Mike Brewer and Tom Shipley, except where indicated
Side A
"Truly Right" (Mike Brewer) – 2:46
"She Thinks She's a Woman"  – 3:26
"Time and Changes" (Tom Shipley) – 2:05
"Small Town Girl" – 2:10
"I Can't See Her" – 2:50
"Green Bamboo" – 3:10

Side B
"An Incredible State of Affairs" – 3:10
"Keeper of the Keys" – 3:24
"Love, Love" (Brewer & Shipley, Keith Brewer) – 3:12
"Dreamin' in the Shade" – 2:10
"Mass for M'Lady" – 3:17

Personnel
Mike Brewer – vocals, guitars, percussion
Tom Shipley – vocals, guitars, percussion
Nick DeCaro – strings, horns
Jim Gordon – drums
Hal Blaine – drums
Milt Holland – percussion
Lyle Ritz – bass
Jim Messina – bass
Joe Osborn – bass
Russell Bridges – electric piano, organ
Mike Melvoin – organ
Lance Wakely – electric guitar, harp

Brewer & Shipley albums
1968 debut albums
A&M Records albums
Albums produced by Jerry Riopelle